Selles is a commune in the Haute-Saône department in the region of Bourgogne-Franche-Comté in eastern France.

The river Côney flows through the village and also the canal de l'Est. The canal can be crossed in Selles using a metal bridge which is opened manually to allow canal boats to pass through. Locally the bridge is known as Le Pont Tournant and there is a restaurant of the same name by the canal.

Visitors to Selles can visit the Jean Roussey cheese factory which has free entry. There is a tasting room and shop where the cheeses that are produced there can be bought by visitors.

The area is characterised by the many springs that emerge from the ground and these are used for drinking and washing even today.

See also
Communes of the Haute-Saône department

References

Communes of Haute-Saône